The Garo spineless eel, Garo khajuriai, is a species of earthworm eel endemic to India. It belongs to the monotypic genus Garo. It is demersal and lives in fresh water

Distribution
This species is found in the Garo Hills in Meghalaya and in the Kaziranga Wildlife Sanctuary in Assam, India.

References

Kullander, S.O., R. Britz and F. Fang. (2000). Pillaia kachinica, a new chaudhuriid fish from Myanmar, with observations on the genus Garo (Teleostei: Chaudhuriidae). Ichthyol. Explor. Freshwat. 11(4):327-334.

Fish described in 1977